The England women's national under-20 basketball team is a national basketball team of England, administered by the Basketball England. It represents the country in women's international under-20 basketball competitions. In 2002 and 2004, the team participated at the FIBA Europe Under-20 Championship for Women qualifications.

Team results

See also
England women's national basketball team
England women's national under-18 basketball team

References

Basketball in England
Basketball
Women's national under-20 basketball teams